There were three special elections to the United States House of Representatives in 2019 during the 116th United States Congress.

Two of the three seats were won by the party previously holding the seat. One seat, which was left vacant, was picked up by the Republican Party.

Summary 

Elections are listed by date and district.

|-
! 
| Tom Marino
| 
| 2010
|  | Incumbent resigned January 23, 2019 to take job in private sector.New member elected May 21, 2019.Republican hold.
| nowrap | 

|-
! 
| Walter B. Jones Jr.
| 
| 1994
|  | Incumbent died February 10, 2019.New member elected September 10, 2019.Republican hold.
| nowrap | 

|-
! 
| colspan=3 | Vacant
|  | In the 2018 election certification was denied under a cloud of suspected election fraud.New member elected September 10, 2019.Republican hold.
| nowrap | 
|}

Pennsylvania's 12th congressional district 

Incumbent Republican Tom Marino resigned from office on January 23, 2019 to work in the private sector. Governor Tom Wolf called for an election to be held on May 21, four months after Marino's resignation. Primary elections were not held, with nominees being chosen by each party. Republican nominee Fred Keller secured the seat from the Democratic nominee Marc Friedenberg, who was the only candidate to submit an application.

North Carolina's 3rd congressional district 

Incumbent Republican Walter B. Jones Jr., who was planning to retire from Congress, died on February 10, 2019. Governor Roy Cooper scheduled the special election for September 10, 2019, with primaries being held on April 30. Republican nominee Greg Murphy won a clear victory, defeating Democrat Allen M. Thomas, Libertarian Tim Harris, and Constitution candidate Greg Holt.

North Carolina's 9th congressional district 

The seat was left vacant after the results of the 2018 election were uncertified by the state election board due to allegations of electoral fraud. Because of the previous election's slim margin (around 900 votes), this election was considered highly competitive. Primaries were held on May 14, and the general election was held on September 10. Republican nominee Dan Bishop defeated Democratic candidate Dan McCready by a slightly larger margin than Mark Harris.

References 

 
2019